Le Croisty is a commune in the Morbihan department of Brittany in north-western France. Inhabitants of Le Croisty are called in French Croistyates.

Toponymy

From the breton kroaz which means cross and ty which means house. Le Croisty can be translated as the house of the cross. In the past, the village belonged to the Knights Hospitaller.

Geography

Historically, the village belongs to Vannetais and Pays Pourlet. Le Croisty is border by Priziac to the west, by Saint-Tugdual to the north, by Ploërdut to the east and by Saint-Caradec-Trégomel to the south. Apart from the village centre, there are about fifty hamlets. Most of the hamlets consist of two or three houses but others are larger like the village of Cornhospital.

Map

History

Le Croisty was created as a new commune in 1903. Before that, it came within the administrative area of the village of Saint-Tugdual.

Population

See also
Communes of the Morbihan department

References

External links

Official site 

Mayors of Morbihan Association 

Communes of Morbihan